Jacques "Jacky" Brichant (28 March 1930 – 9 March 2011) was a Belgian tennis player.

Brichant has played the most Davis Cup ties for his country. Brichant reached the semi-finals of the French Championships in singles in 1958 which he lost to eventual champion Mervyn Rose. Additionally he reached the French quarter-finals three times (1956, 1957, 1959). He won the national Belgian title 10 times.

In 1950 he was the runner-up at the All England Plate event, a tennis competition held at the Wimbledon Championships consisting of players who were defeated in the first or second rounds of the singles competition.

References

External links
 
 

Belgian male tennis players
Sportspeople from Hainaut (province)
2011 deaths
1930 births
Grand Slam (tennis) champions in boys' singles
French Championships junior (tennis) champions